The Wad Medani Ahlia University is a private university based in the town of Wad Madani in the state of Gezira, Sudan.

References

Universities and colleges in Sudan
Al Jazirah (state)
Educational institutions established in 1992
1992 establishments in Sudan